Wyndham Edgar Evans (born 19 March 1951) is a Welsh football commentator and former player and manager.

Playing career
Born in Llanelli, Evans played as a right back. After playing as an amateur with Stoke City, Evans turned professional with Swansea City in February 1971, making 389 appearances in the Football League for them over two spells. While at Swansea, Evans competed in all four divisions of the Football League.

Management career
Evans had spells as player-manager of both Llanelli and Pembroke Borough, before returning to manage Llanelli.

Media career
Evans later became a commentator for Swansea City's TV service.

Personal life
His nephew is Stuart Roberts, who also played for Swansea.

Career statistics
Source:

References

1951 births
Living people
Welsh footballers
Welsh football managers
Stoke City F.C. players
Swansea City A.F.C. players
Llanelli Town A.F.C. players
English Football League players
Association football defenders
Llanelli Town A.F.C. managers
Carmarthen Town A.F.C. managers
Pembroke Borough A.F.C. players
Association football commentators